Coleophora pseudodianthi is a moth of the family Coleophoridae. It is found in central Bulgaria and southern Ukraine.

The wingspan is 14–18 mm. Adults have been recorded in May in Ukraine and in June in Bulgaria.

The larvae probably feed on Dianthus species.

Etymology
The specific name refers to the close affinity with Coleophora dianthi.

References

pseudodianthi
Moths of Europe
Moths described in 2006